Ming Li is a Canadian computer scientist, known for his fundamental contributions to Kolmogorov complexity, bioinformatics, machine learning theory, and analysis of algorithms. Li is currently a professor of Computer Science at the David R. Cheriton School of Computer Science at the University of Waterloo. He holds a Tier I Canada Research Chair in Bioinformatics. In addition to academic achievements, his research has led to the founding of two independent companies.

Education
Li  received a Master of Science degree (Computer Science) from Wayne State University in 1980 and earned a Doctor of Philosophy degree (Computer Science) under the supervision of Juris Hartmanis, from Cornell University in 1985. His post-doctoral research was conducted at Harvard University under the supervision of Leslie Valiant.

Career
Paul Vitanyi and Li pioneered Kolmogorov complexity theory and applications, and co-authored the textbook An Introduction to Kolmogorov Complexity and Its Applications,.

In 2000, Li founded Bioinformatics Solutions Inc, a biomedical software company, primarily providing solutions for tandem mass spectrometry protein characterization. Originally developed to identify novel peptides through de novo peptide sequencing, the technology has been adapted to address antibody characterization. Other products have included protein structure prediction, general purpose homology searching, and next generation sequencing glyco-peptide research.

In 2013, Li co-founded Technologies Inc, an artificial intelligence company. Utilizing statistical machine learning, deep neural networks, and natural language processing, the company develops a unique language-understanding platform for knowledge mining, sentence parsing, practical question-answering, and human-computer chatting. The software has been applied on voice-control navigation systems, personal tour guide applications, robotics, and other intelligent electronics.

Awards and honours
 1996 - E.W.R. Steacie Memorial Fellowship, NSERC
 1997 - Award of Merit, FCCP
 2001 - Killam Research Fellowship, Canada Council for the Arts
 2002 - Canada Research Chair in Bioinformatics, Tier I
 2006 - Fellow, Institute of Electrical and Electronics Engineers, Pioneer Award
 2006 - Fellow, Association for Computing Machinery
 2006 - Fellow, Royal Society of Canada
 2009 - Premier’s Discovery Award (Innovation Leadership)
 2021 - Fellow of the International Society for Computational Biology.

References

External links
 Home page

Living people
Canadian computer scientists
Fellows of the Royal Society of Canada
Wayne State University alumni
Cornell University alumni
University of Toronto alumni
Academic staff of the University of Waterloo
Year of birth missing (living people)